Dehrud Rural District is in Eram District of Dashtestan County, Bushehr province, Iran. At the census of 2006, its population was 5,507 in 1,097 households; there were 5,072 inhabitants in 1,242 households at the following census of 2011; and in the most recent census of 2016, the population of the rural district was 5,372 in 1,459 households. The largest of its 16 villages was Dehrud-e Sofla, with 2,218 people.

References 

Rural Districts of Bushehr Province
Populated places in Dashtestan County